1912 in Argentine football saw the division of Argentine football into two rival associations, when Federación Argentina de Football (FAF) was established to organise its own championships. Thus, Quilmes won the official AFA tournament, while Porteño won the FAF title.

Primera División

Asociación Argentina de Football - Copa Campeonato 
Many former players of Alumni (dissolved one year later) went to play for Quilmes, which would be the champion. The tournament had no relegations.

Federación Argentina de Football 
In July 1912, Gimnasia y Esgrima de Buenos Aires disaffiliated from Asociación Argentina de Football, founding the Federación Argentina de Football (FAF) presided by Ricardo Aldao. Recently promoted teams Porteño and Estudiantes (LP) joined the new league, among other clubs.

1912 was the inaugural season of the dissident FAF league. This tournament was formed by 3 dissident teams from the Asociación Argentina (AAF): Estudiantes de La Plata, Gimnasia y Esgrima (BA) and Porteño, plus the 4 teams promoted from the second division: Argentino de Quilmes, Atlanta, Independiente and Kimberley (Villa Devoto). The last club added was the recently created Sociedad Sportiva Argentina.

Championship playoff
Independiente and Porteño finished level on points at the top of the table, necessitating a championship playoff. The game was suspended at 87' after the Independiente players abandoned the pitch in protest at a disallowed goal by referee Carlos Aertz. The championship was then awarded to Porteño.

Final

Lower divisions

Intermedia
AFA Champion: Ferro Carril Oeste
FAF Champion: Tigre

Segunda División
AFA Champion: Banfield
FAF Champion: Tigre

Domestic cups

Copa de Honor Municipalidad de Buenos Aires
Champion: Racing Club

Final

Copa de Competencia Jockey Club
Champion: San Isidro

Final

Final

International cups

Tie Cup
Champion:  San Isidro

Final

Copa de Honor Cousenier
Champion:  River Plate

Final

Argentina national team
Argentina only won one of the five Cups disputed against Uruguay, the Copa Montevideo played in December 1912.

Copa Lipton

Copa Premier Honor Uruguayo

Copa Premier Honor Argentino

Copa Newton

Copa Montevideo

Friendly matches

Notes

 
Seasons in Argentine football